King Ceasor University is a private university previously known as St. Augustine International University.

Location
King Ceasor University is a multi-campus university. It maintains the following campuses:
Bunga Campus
The main campus is located in the neighborhood of Bunga, in Makindye Division, one of the five administrative divisions of Uganda's capital city, Kampala. The approximate coordinates of the main campus of King Ceasor University are:0°16'21.0"N, 32°37'19.0"E (Latitude:0.272500; Longitude:32.621944).
Kisoro Campus
The campus is close to Saint Francis Hospital Mutolere, in Mutolere, which will serve as one of the teaching hospitals of the university. 
Mulago Campus
This location is adjacent to Mulago National Referral Hospital, another teaching hospital of the university.   
Namugongo Campus
The location lies close to the shrines of the Uganda Martyrs, with streams flowing through the campus. The College of Agriculture and Veterinary Medicine will be based here.

Overview
King Ceasor University (KCU) is one of the private, cosmopolitan universities in Uganda established in 2011 with a diversity of international students from Tanzania, Nigeria, Palestine, India, Rwanda, Malawi, Ethiopia, and South Sudan to name a few. Our colleges of Medicine and Life Science, Law and Business Management, Engineering and Informatics, among others, offer an array of program options that put you in pole position to begin your career.

King Ceasor University is the brainchild of King Ceasor Mulenga for public benefit and it is recognized globally. So far, KCU has offered access to a wide range of academic opportunities. As a world leader in higher education, the University has pioneered change in the sector.

It is accredited by the Uganda National Council for Higher Education, the national body that licenses institutions of higher education in the country. The multi-campus university is one of a number of private universities accredited between 2010 and 2014. The founding vice chancellor of the university is Charity Basaza Mulenga, an electrical and computer science engineer trained at Makerere University in Uganda and Loughborough University in the United Kingdom.

Academic departments

King Ceasor University Schools and programs:
 School of Medicine
 School of Health Science
 School of Public health
 School of Computing
 School of Business
 School of Law

Academic courses
Listed below, are some of the undergraduate courses on offer, as of December 2020.
 Bachelor of Medicine & Bachelor of Surgery
 Bachelor of Medical Records & Health Informatics
 Bachelor of Science in Nursing
 Diploma in Clinical Medicine and Community Health
 Bachelor of Laws
 Bachelor of Business Administration
 Diploma in Global Business
 BSc in Oil And Gas Management
 Bachelor of Science in Petroleum Geoscience
 Bachelor of Digital Forensics & Cyber Crime Investigation

See also
 Ggaba
 Kansanga
 Education in Uganda
 List of universities in Uganda
 List of university leaders in Uganda

References

External links
  Webpage of King Ceasor University

King Ceasor University
Educational institutions established in 2011
Education in Kampala
Makindye Division
2011 establishments in Uganda